Tiramisu (Italian Tiramisù) is an Italian dessert

Tiramisu may also refer to:
Android Tiramisu, version of operating system with the codename "Tiramisu".
Tiramisu (2002 film), Japanese market name of 2002 Cantonese film
Tiramisu (2008 film), Dutch film
Tirami Su, 1987 jazz album by Al Di Meola
Tirami Su, classical ensemble led by Erin Headley
"Tirami Su", German song by Heinz Rudolf Kunze from Der Golem Aus Lemgo 1994  
"Tirami Su", Italian song by Irene Fornaciari from Vertigini in Fiore  2007
"Tirami Su", German song by Roberto Blanco